Edgewood Plantation may refer to:

Edgewood Plantation (Leon County, Florida)
Edgewood (Farmerville, Louisiana), also known as Edgewood Plantation, listed on the National Register of Historic Places (NRHP) in Union Parish
Edgewood (Natchez, Mississippi), also known as Edgewood Plantation, NRHP-listed in Adams County
Edgewood Plantation and Harrison's Mill, Charles City County, Virginia, NRHP-listed

See also
Edgewood (disambiguation)